CMA CGM Butterfly is one of the largest container ships in the world. It is one of the largest ships in the French company's fleet, built in South Korea. The ship went around Africa (adding seven days to the trip) to avoid a $600,000 toll for the 9,660 TEU ship passing through the Suez Canal. CMA CGM Butterfly is one of the last generation of 9,700 teu ships.

CMA CGM Butterfly was built by Hyundai Heavy Industries,m completed in 2008. Its total maximum cargo capacity is 9661 TEU. The ship is 337 m in length and has a beam of 42.8 m.

The cargo vessel is powered by Wärtsilä 12RTA96C, a 2 stroke 12 cylinder engine, capable or generating a total power of 68,639 kW (93,322 hp) driving 1 fixed prop propeller.

References

Butterfly
Container ships
2008 ships